Capital Radio is a song and an extended play by the English punk rock band the Clash. The original song has been included as "Capital Radio" or "Capital Radio One" on the Capital Radio EP (1977), Black Market Clash (1980), The Story of the Clash, Volume 1 (1988), Clash on Broadway (1991), From Here to Eternity: Live (1999), The Essential Clash (2003), and Singles Box (2006).

Lyrics
Lyrically, the song is an attack on the music policy of what was (at the time) London's only legal commercial music radio station, which played sophisticated pop, some mainstream chart hits but little punk, though they did playlist The Jam's first single 'In The City', while the Sex Pistols' 'Pretty Vacant' made the Top 3 of their 'Capital Countdown' playlist. The Clash song mentions the station's then-Head of Music, Aidan Day"He picks all the hits they play/to keep you in your place all day":

The song ends with a parody of one of Capital's actual jingles of the period; the band replaces the lyric "in tune with London" with "in tune with nothing". The parody is heightened by the use of a variation on the ending riff from "I'm Only Dreaming" by the Small Faces.

Capital Radio E.P.

The extended play record Capital Radio was released on 9 April 1977, but was not sold commercially. Instead, it was given away free to readers who sent off a coupon printed in the NME, plus the red sticker found on the band's debut studio album The Clash (1977). The E.P. was produced by Mickey Foote and engineered by Simon Humphrey. The interview with the band was conducted by the NME's writer Tony Parsons and was recorded during a trip on a London Underground train.

Track listing

Personnel

"Capital Radio"
 Joe Strummerlead vocal, rhythm guitar
 Mick Jonesbacking vocals, lead & rhythm guitar
 Paul Simononbass guitar
 Terry Chimesdrums

"Listen"
 Mick Joneslead guitars
 Joe Strummerlead guitar
 Paul Simononbass guitar
 Terry Chimesdrums

Capital Radio Two

By late 1978 the original EP had become very rare in the UK, and started to be sold for high prices by collectors and some unscrupulous record shops. Partly to prevent this profiteering from what they had originally intended as a free gift to fans, the group decided to re-record "Capital Radio" for a new extended play record The Cost of Living, which was released on 7-inch vinyl on 11 May 1979 through CBS Records. This new version, later titled "Capital Radio Two", is longer (3:19) than the original version, mainly because of a protracted intro and outro. "Capital Radio Two" has been included on Super Black Market Clash (1994) and Singles Box (2006), whereas "Capital Radio One" was included on the original version of the former, Black Market Clash.

Personnel
 Joe Strummerlead vocal, rhythm guitar
 Mick Jonesbacking vocals, lead & rhythm guitars
 Paul Simononbass guitar
 Topper Headondrums

References

Sources

 

1977 debut EPs
1977 songs
The Clash songs
The Clash EPs